Steve or Steven Greenberg may refer to:

 Steve Greenberg (businessman) (born 1971), Illinois Congressional candidate, businessman, and former professional hockey player
 Steve Greenberg (record producer), owner of S-Curve Records
 Steve Greenberg (television personality) (born 1960), "Innovation Insider"
 Steven Greenberg (musician) (born 1950), writer and producer of "Funkytown"; and owner of October Records
 Steven Greenberg (rabbi) (born 1956), openly gay Orthodox rabbi